Charlottetown-Parkdale was a provincial electoral district for the Legislative Assembly of Prince Edward Island, Canada. It was created prior to the 2007 election from parts of Sherwood-Hillsborough, Parkdale-Belvedere and Charlottetown-Kings Square.

The riding consisted of most of the Parkdale neighbourhood and the St. Avard's and Belvedere neighbourhoods of Charlottetown.

Members
The riding has elected the following Members of the Legislative Assembly:

Election results

Charlottetown-Parkdale, 2007–2019

2016 electoral reform plebiscite results

References

 Charlottetown-Parkdale information

Politics of Charlottetown
Former provincial electoral districts of Prince Edward Island